Skovorodino may refer to:
Skovorodino Urban Settlement, an administrative division and a municipal formation which the town of Skovorodino and the settlement of Lesnoy in Skovorodinsky District of Amur Oblast, Russia are incorporated as
Skovorodino (inhabited locality), several inhabited localities in Russia
Skovorodino railway station, a railway station on the Baikal-Amur Mainline in the town of Skovorodino in Amur Oblast, Russia